Chauvay is a village in Kadamjay District of Batken Region of Kyrgyzstan. It was established in regard with the extraction of mercury and antimony in 1947. Its population was 1,636 in 2021. Until 2012 it was an urban-type settlement.

Nearby villages include Kara-Kyshtak and Kara-Jygach.

Population

References

External links 
Satellite map at Maplandia.com

Populated places in Batken Region